Lisa Zimmermann (born March 2, 1996 in Nuremberg) is a German freestyle skier. She won the gold medal in slopestyle at the 2015 World Championships in Kreischberg.

World Cup results

Season titles
 1 title – (1 slopestyle)

Season standings

Race Podiums
 4 wins – (2 SS, 2 BA)
 7 podiums – (4 SS, 3 BA)

Olympic results

World Championships results

References

External links
 

1996 births
Living people
German female freestyle skiers
Olympic freestyle skiers of Germany
Freestyle skiers at the 2014 Winter Olympics
Sportspeople from Nuremberg
21st-century German women